Amblyseius subtilidentis is a species of mite in the family Phytoseiidae.

References

subtilidentis
Articles created by Qbugbot
Animals described in 1993
Taxa named by Wolfgang Karg